Wally E. Horn (born November 28, 1933) is a former Iowa State Senator who served the 27th, 25, and 17th Districts.

Horn served on several committees in the Iowa Senate - the Judiciary committee; the Labor and Business Relations committee; the Rebuild Iowa committee; and the State Government committee.  He also serves on the Education Appropriations Subcommittee.

Early life and education
Horn was raised in Bloomfield, Iowa and graduated from Bloomfield High School. A Democrat, he received his BS and MA from Northeastern Missouri State Teachers College, with graduate work done at Texas A&M University and the University of Texas at Austin.

Career
Outside of his political career, Horn worked for more than 30 years as a high school teacher, coach, and information facilitator for schools in Cedar Rapids, Iowa. Prior, he served in the US Army.

Organizations

Current memberships
Council State Government
Midwest Legislature's Executive Board
Executive committee for the Democratic Legislative Campaign Committee
Community Correction Board 
Elks and Moose Lodges Board
American Legion 
Veterans of Foreign Wars

Past memberships
NCSL Executive Board (15 years)

Family
Horn is married to his wife Phyllis Peterson and together they have two children and seven grandchildren.

References

External links
Senator Wally Horn official Iowa Legislature site
Senator Wally Horn official Iowa General Assembly site
State Senator Wally Horn official constituency site
 

1933 births
Living people
Democratic Party Iowa state senators
Truman State University alumni
Texas A&M University alumni
University of Texas at Austin alumni
People from Bloomfield, Iowa
Politicians from Cedar Rapids, Iowa
Democratic Party members of the Iowa House of Representatives
21st-century American politicians